SYSCO may refer to:

Sydney Steel Corporation, the Canadian Crown Corporation
Sysco, the American food distributor